Lake Ahémé is Benin's second largest lake, with an area of  in the dry season which expands to  in the rainy season. The Couffo River drains into the swampy north end of the lake, while the 10 km-long Aho Channel connects the lake's southern end to the Grand-Popo Lagoon on the Atlantic coast. This channel flows south during the wet season but reverses direction in the dry season, which causes the salinity of the lake's southern end to increase.

The Pedah and the Ayizo are the two main ethnic groups living on the shores of Lake Ahémé. Fishing and agriculture are the main economic activities in the area. In the lake, 71 species of fish have been recorded.

The  comprising the marshes of the lower Couffo, Lake Ahémé, the Aho Channel and the adjoining coastal lagoon have been designated as a Ramsar site and an Important Bird Area.

References

Aheme
Ramsar sites in Benin
Important Bird Areas of Benin